Sahavas  (Vedanta - singular & plural, also sahawas; sahavasa) literally means dwelling together, close companionship, or in the company of. It may also refer to a spiritual retreat or a gathering held by a guru or master so that his devotees may enjoy his company, i.e., his physical presence, or a gathering in his honor where his followers meet to remember him.

See also
 Ashram
 Darshan

References

Hindu philosophical concepts